Papua New Guinea competed at the 2014 Summer Youth Olympics, in Nanjing, China from 16 August to 28 August 2014.

Athletics

Papua New Guinea qualified one athlete.

Qualification Legend: Q=Final A (medal); qB=Final B (non-medal); qC=Final C (non-medal); qD=Final D (non-medal); qE=Final E (non-medal)

Boys
Track & road events

Football

Papua New Guinea will compete in the girls' tournament.

Girls' Tournament

Roster

 Grace Batiy
 Eileen Daviaga
 Belinda Giada
 Mercedes Hapoto
 Vicktyla Jackson
 Margret Joseph
 Faith Kasiray
 Robertlyn Kig
 Cheryl Ling
 Francesca Mani
 Samantha Matan
 Joanne Miping
 Isabella Natera
 Alison Paulias
 Natasha Sagem
 Marity Sep
 Selina Unamba
 Loreta Yagum

Group Stage

Placement 5-6

Sailing

Papua New Guinea was given a reallocation boat based on being a top ranked nation not yet qualified.

Swimming

Papua New Guinea qualified two swimmers.

Boys

Girls

Weightlifting

Papua New Guinea qualified 1 quota in the boys' and girls' events based on the team ranking after the 2014 Weightlifting Oceania Championships.

Boys

Girls

References

2014 in Papua New Guinean sport
Nations at the 2014 Summer Youth Olympics
Papua New Guinea at the Youth Olympics